Digranes is one of the 5 districts of Kópavogur. The district's borders are defined by the Hafnarfjarðarvegur in the west, Kópavogslækur in the south, Fossvogslækur in the north and the Reykjanesbraut in the east.

History

Digranes is one of the oldest settlements in Iceland, dating back to around 1300. By the year 1936 most farming activities in Digranes had ceased.

Ruins of the Digranes village lay next to the Digranes Gymnasium.

References

Sources
"Hverfi Kópavogs". kopavogur.is. Retrieved August 2, 2020.
"Digranes". kopavogur.is. Retrieved August 2, 2020.
."Fornleifakönnun á Bæjarhól". by Guðmundur Ólafsson. Vinnuskýrslur Þjóðminjasafns. 2013.

Kópavogur
Populated places in Capital Region (Iceland)